Peter Høier Holtermann (16 November 1820 – 24 August 1865) was a Norwegian architect.

Biography
He was born in Austrått, in Ørland municipality, Sør-Trøndelag County, Norway. He was a son of assessor Ove Bjelke Holtermann (1782–1857), and a second cousin of major general Eiler Christian Holtermann, uncle of architect Ove Bjelke Holtermann and a granduncle of major general Hans Reidar Holtermann.

He attended the Norwegian National Academy of Craft and Art Industry before studying in Berlin from 1842 to 1846. In 1846 he returned to Norway and established an architect's office in Christiania. His designs include the Norwegian College of Agriculture, Christiania Seildugsfabrik, Tromsø city hall and Christiania Sparebank, all erected during the 1850s and 1860s. His church designs include those in Nes, Aremark, Treungen and Holla. Many of his works have been torn down or destroyed.

From 1862 to his death he was the chairman of the Norwegian Polytechnic Society. He died in 1865 in a working accident.

Selected works

Churches
 Haslum Church (rebuilt 1853)
 Nes Church, Akershus 1860
 Aremark Church (1861)
 Bryn Church (1861)
 Treungen Church (1863)
 Holla Church (1865–67)

Other
 Agricultural University at Ås (1854–1959)
 Christiania Seildugsfabrik in Oslo (1856)
 Akerselvens Klædefabrik (1865)
 City Hall and the Latin School in Tromsø (1862–1965)

References

1820 births
1865 deaths
People from Ørland
Norwegian expatriates in Germany
Accidental deaths in Norway
19th-century Norwegian architects